Kathleen P. King (born in Providence, Rhode Island) is an American author and educator. As of 2006, she was a professor and director of Fordham University's Regional Educational Technology Center (RETC), Center for Professional Development and Program Director of the graduate program in Adult Education and Human Resource Development at the Graduate School of Education.

King's background includes work as a private computer consultant in troubleshooting and training, combining her knowledge of adult education with computer technology in faculty and staff development.

In August 2005, King and Mark Gura created, developed and produced Podcast for Teachers, Techpod (SM), a weekly educational technology professional development podcast for educators. King has developed 5 additional podcasts and collaborated with BXRadio Network to create iLearn Radio, an internet radio station which streams educational podcast content.

Before arriving at Fordham in 1997, King also taught at Widener University, Holy Family College, and the Pennsylvania Institute of Technology. King received her Ed.D. from Widener University.

King has received professional and academic awards, including the Frandson Book Award, (2007); University Continuing Education Association; North American Adult Educators: Phyllis M. Cunningham Archive of Quintessential Autobiographies for the 21st Century. (2007 Recognition); Lawrence S. Levin Achievement Award (2006) from the NYACCE; the POD Network Innovation Award (2005), and Robert J. Menges Honored Research Award from POD Network (2003).

References
 King, K. P. & Gura, M. (2007). Podcasting for teachers: Podcasting Using a new technology to revolutionize teaching and learning. Educational technology Charlottesville, NC: Information Age Publishing.
 Gura, M. & King, K. P. (Eds.) (2007). Classroom robotics. Educational technology Charlottesville, NC: Information Age Publishing.
 King, K. P. & Wang. V.C.X. (2007). Comparative Adult Education around the globe. Hangzhou, PR China: Zhejiang University Press. (Distributed worldwide by BX Media LLC)
 King, K. P. & Griggs, J. (2006). Harnessing innovative technologies in higher education. distance learning. Madision, WI: Atwood. 
 King, K. P. (2005). Bringing transformative learning to life. Malabar, FL: Krieger. 
 King, K. P. (2003). Keeping pace with technology: Educational technology that transforms. Vol. Two: The challenge and promise for higher education faculty. Cresskill, NJ: Hampton Press.
 King, K. P. (2002). Keeping pace with technology: Educational technology that transforms. Vol. One: The challenge and promise for K-12 educators. Cresskill, NJ: Hampton Press. 
 King, K. P. & Griggs, J. K. (Eds). (2006). Harnessing innovative technology in higher education: Access, equity, policy and instruction. Madison, WI: Atwood.
 King, K. P. & Lawler, P. A. (Eds.). (2003, June). New perspectives on designing and implementing professional development for teachers of adults, New Directions in Adult and Continuing Education, No. 98. San Francisco: Jossey-Bass. 
 Lawler, P. A., & King, K. P. (2000). Planning for effective faculty development: Using adult learning strategies. Malabar, FL: Krieger. 
 Perspectives; The New York Journal of Adult Learning. New York: Fordham University.

Living people
Fordham University faculty
Widener University faculty
American women podcasters
American podcasters
Holy Family University
21st-century American women
Year of birth missing (living people)